Banyo (Fula: Banyo 𞤦𞤢𞤲𞤴𞤮) is a town and commune in Adamawa Province, Cameroon. Though a government prefect serves in the town, the lamido still holds great sway among the population. The current lamido, S.E. Mohaman Gabdo Yahya, has written his own history (2009). The geographer Jean Hurault has published on the demography of the area, and summarized some of the history in his 1955 work (see references below). In the nineteenth century, Banyo separated from Koncha and Tibati (see Adama, H. & T.M. Bah 2001).

History 
 Battle of Banjo in November 1915

Climate
Banyo has a tropical savanna climate (Aw) with moderate to little rainfall from November to March and moderate to heavy rainfall from April to October.

See also
Communes of Cameroon

References 

 Adama, H. & T.M. Bah 2001. Un manuscrit Arabe sur l'histoire du royaume Peul de Kontcha dans le Nord-Cameroum: XIXe-XXe siecle. Rabat: Institut des Etudes africaines, Université Mohamed V.
 Hurault, Jean M. 1955. Le Lamidat de Banyo. Yaoundé: Unpublished Report. Archives L'IRCAM.
 Hurault, Jean M. 1975. Histoire du Lamidat Peul de Banyo. Outre-Mer: Academie Sciences.
 Hurault, Jean M. 1983. Fecondité et Mortalité dans L'Agglomeration Urbaine de Banyo (Cameroun). Cah. Orstom ser. Sci. Hum. 19(3): 247–267.
 Hurault, Jean M. 1994. Les noms attribués aux non-libres dans le lamidat de Banyo. Journal des africanistes 64(1): 91-107.
 Yahya, Mohaman Gabdo 2009. Le Lamidat de Banyo: épreuves d’hier et défis d’aujourd’hui Douala: AFREDIT (africaine d’édition).

Communes of Cameroon
Populated places in Adamawa Region